Aleksino is a rural locality (a village) in Karinskoye Rural Settlement, Alexandrovsky District, Vladimir Oblast, Russia. The population was 24 as of 2010. There are 4 streets.

Geography 
Aleksino is located 35 km southwest of Alexandrov (the district's administrative centre) by road. Novozhilovo is the nearest rural locality.

References 

Rural localities in Alexandrovsky District, Vladimir Oblast
Alexandrovsky Uyezd (Vladimir Governorate)